Bompeh Senior High Technical School is a senior high school located in Sekondi-Takoradi in the Western Region of Ghana.

History
The school used to be one of the Axim Road Middle Schools. It was selected, expanded and developed into a junior high school by the Ghana Education Service in September 1976 and was named Axim Road Experimental Junior High School.

In October 1985, upon the request of the Regional Directorate, the Director General of Education service upgraded the school to a senior high school level and the school was christened Bompeh Day Secondary School after the deceased Sekondi chief who showed much interest in education matters during his reign. It was not, however, until 1989 that the first batch of O/L students were presented. Former students of the school are popularly known as Young Royals, and students in the school are called Bompehrian.

List of Head Prefects

List of Headmasters/Mistresses

Notable alumni 

 Bridget Otoo - Ghanaian media personality and journalist.

See also

 Education in Ghana
 List of schools in Ghana

References

1985 establishments in Ghana
Educational institutions established in 1985
High schools in Ghana
Sekondi-Takoradi
Technical schools
Education in the Western Region (Ghana)